The men's 100 metre backstroke event at the 2020 Summer Olympics was held from 25 to 27 July 2021 at the Tokyo Aquatics Centre. It was the event's twenty-sixth appearance, having been held at every edition since 1904 except 1964. Moreover, these Games marked the first time when the men's sprint backstroke event was held in Tokyo, as the event was not included in the swimming program in 1964.

Traditionally, the event has been dominated by Americans, who have won 15 gold medals in 25 Olympic men's 100 metre backstroke competitions, and all gold medals in the event since 1996. This time, 2016 Olympic bronze medalist and 2019 World Championship silver medalist Evgeny Rylov edged his compatriot Kliment Kolesnikov and defending Olympic champion and world record holder Ryan Murphy, who did not medal in 2019, to win first gold for Russia in this event and also the first gold medal in swimming for Russia since Larisa Ilchenko won the open water competition in 2008. Rylov subsequently repeated the gold medal performance in his signature 200 metres backstroke race.

Records
Prior to this competition, the existing world and Olympic records were as follows.

No new records were set during the competition.

Qualification

 
The Olympic Qualifying Time for the event was 53.85 seconds. Up to two swimmers per National Olympic Committee (NOC) could automatically qualify by swimming that time at an approved qualification event. The Olympic Selection Time was 55.47 seconds. Up to one swimmer per NOC meeting that time was eligible for selection, allocated by world ranking until the maximum quota for all swimming events is reached. NOCs without a male swimmer qualified in any event could also use their universality place.

Competition format

The competition consisted of three rounds: heats, semifinals, and a final. The swimmers with the best 16 times in the heats advanced to the semifinals. The swimmers with the best 8 times in the semifinals advanced to the final.

Schedule
All times are Japan Standard Time (UTC+9)

Results

Heats
The swimmers with the top 16 times, regardless of heat, advanced to the semifinals.

Semifinals
The swimmers with the best 8 times, regardless of heat, advanced to the final.

Final

References

Men's 00100 metre backstroke
Olympics
Men's events at the 2020 Summer Olympics